The American Youth Symphony (AYS) is an orchestra based in Los Angeles, California, United States, It was founded in 1964.

Carlos Izcaray was announced as the third music director in the orchestra's history in 2016.

History

AYS was founded in 1964 by conductor Mehli Mehta (father of Zubin Mehta and Zarin Mehta), then Director of the Orchestra Department at UCLA. Mehta led AYS for 33 seasons, retiring at age 90. Of his reasons for founding AYS, Mehta said:

"It takes a lifetime to learn symphonic literature... When they leave the American Youth Symphony they will have performed all the symphonies of Beethoven, Brahms, Tchaikovsky and Dvořák, plus the last six symphonies of Mozart, five of Mahler, two of Bruckner and all the Strauss tone poems. To be a musician, you must know these things."

Training

During the 2013/14 season, AYS was composed of 108 musicians from 26 schools. Training with AYS is tuition-free, and acceptance is competitive. Each season, 250-300 applicants audition to fill an average of 30 open positions.

Composer and violinist David Newman (an alumnus of AYS), said of the training:

"It's a place where talented kids... come together every weekend and rehearse, with the idea of performing the standard classical music repertoire. So it's a training orchestra, but it's almost the same as a professional orchestra, the quality is so good... Anyone can play in our group. You have to audition to get in but if you're good, anyone can play."

Programs

AYS performs five to seven concerts each season, and the majority of concerts are presented free to the public at UCLA's Royce Hall. Performances have been described by the Los Angeles Times as possessing "polish and depth". The repertoire includes classical masterworks, along with contemporary compositions and film music.

Past guest artists have included Sarah Chang, Daníel Bjarnason, Anna Clyne, Johannes Moser, Lera Auerbach, Valentina Lisitsa, David Newman, Alan Silvestri, Charles Fox, Danny Elfman and John Williams.

The Hollywood Projects

In May 2012, AYS launched the multi-year "Elfman Project" featuring the scores of composer Danny Elfman, and conducted by Oscar-nominated film composer David Newman.

This project follows a similar three-year exploration of the work of film composer Jerry Goldsmith, and serves the dual purpose of training young musicians in the art of playing for film, and restoring and preserving film scores.

The Elfman Project has received attention and praise from the film music community, with Justin Craig of Film Score Monthly writing:

"The American Youth Symphony stands high, mastering the challenge of performing film music with all its unconventional meters and rhythms. Don’t be deceived by the label of “youth” orchestra; the AYS is the real deal."

This project has been supported by the Los Angeles County Arts Commission, the James Irvine Foundation, and BMI.

Notable alumni

AYS alumni "populate major American orchestras of all stripes and make up significant percentages of most of the major performing ensemble here in Los Angeles." Currently, thirteen AYS alumni perform with the LA Opera, seven with the Los Angeles Chamber Orchestra, and fourteen with the Los Angeles Philharmonic.

Notable alumni include:

 Nigel Armstrong, violinist
 Danielle Belen, violinist
 Andrew Bulbrook, violinist with the Calder Quartet
 Barry Carl, of Rockapella
 Raynor Carroll, Principal Percussion at LA Phil
 Shoshana Claman, violinist
 Franklyn d'Antonio, Concertmaster of the Berkeley Symphony
 John Gross
 Ken Hamao, violinist
 Mayumi Kanagawa, violinist
 Michelle Kim, Assistant Concertmaster of the NY Phil
 René Mandel, Executive Director of the Berkeley Symphony
 J. Greg Miller, composer and horn player with The Who and The United States Army Field Band
 Jonathan Moerschel, violist with the Calder Quartet
 David Newman, composer and violinist
 Cynthia Phelps, Principal Viola of the New York Philharmonic
 Elizabeth Pitcairn, violinist
 Michael Sachs, Principal Trumpet of the Cleveland Orchestra
 Sheryl Staples, Principal Associate Concertmaster of the NY Phil
 David Stenske, Associate Concertmaster of the LA Opera
 John Walz, Principal Cellist with the LA Opera
 John Yeh, Acting Principal Clarinet of the Chicago Symphony Orchestra

External links
 American Youth Symphony official website

References

Orchestras based in California
Musical groups from Los Angeles